This article is about the demographic features of the population of Zambia, including population density, ethnicity, education level, health of the populace, economic status, religious affiliations and others aspects of the population.

Ethnic groups 
Zambia is one of the most highly urbanised countries in sub-Saharan Africa with 44% of the population concentrated in a few urban areas along the major transport corridors, while rural areas are sparsely populated. Zambia's population comprises more than 72 Bantu-speaking ethnic groups. Some ethnic groups are small, and only two have enough people to constitute at least 10% of the population. The majority of Zambians are subsistence farmers, but the country is also fairly urbanised, with 42% of the population being city residents.  The predominant religion is a blend of traditional beliefs and Christianity.

Immigrants, mostly British or South African, as well as some white Zambian citizens (about 40,000), live mainly in Lusaka and in the Copperbelt in northern Zambia, where they are either employed in mines, financial and related activities or retired. Zambia also has a small but economically important Asian population, most of whom are Indians or Chinese.
. Zambia also has a small coloured population of mixed racial heritage, not included officially on the census since independence.

2010 census 

Source:

Population

The proportion of children below the age of 15 in 2010 was 46.4%, 50.6% was between 15 and 65 years of age, while 3.1% was 65 years or older.

Population Estimates by Sex and Age Group (01.VII.2020):

Vital statistics
Registration of vital events is in Zambia not complete. The website Our World in Data  prepared the following estimates based on statistics from the Population Department of the United Nations.

Fertility and births
Total Fertility Rate (TFR) (Wanted TFR) and Crude Birth Rate (CBR) :

Fertility data as of 2013-2014 (DHS Program):

Fertility rate by religion 
At national level, the TFR was highest among women with no religious affiliation at 6.5. Among the women with religious affiliation Protestants had the highest TFR of 6.0, followed by Muslims with 5.9 and Catholics with 5.7.

Life expectancy

Other demographic statistics 
The following demographic statistics of Zambia in 2022 are from the World Population Review.

One birth every 47 seconds	
One death every 4 minutes	
One net migrant every 65 minutes	
Net gain of one person every 57 seconds

The following demographic statistics are from the CIA World Factbook, unless otherwise indicated.

Population
19,642,123 (2022 est.)
16,445,079 (July 2018 est.)

Age structure

0-14 years: 45.74% (male 4,005,134/female 3,964,969)
15-24 years: 20.03% (male 1,744,843/female 1,746,561)
25-54 years: 28.96% (male 2,539,697/female 2,506,724)
55-64 years: 3.01% (male 242,993/female 280,804)
65 years and over: 2.27% (male 173,582/female 221,316) (2020 est.)

0-14 years: 45.95% (male 3,796,548 /female 3,759,624)
15-24 years: 20% (male 1,643,364 /female 1,645,713)
25-54 years: 28.79% (male 2,384,765 /female 2,349,877)
55-64 years: 2.95% (male 225,586 /female 260,252)
65 years and over: 2.31% (male 166,224 /female 213,126) (2018 est.)

Religions
Protestant 75.3%, Roman Catholic 20.2%, other 2.7% (includes Muslim, Buddhist, Hindu, and Baha'i), none 1.8% (2010 est.)

Birth rate
34.86 births/1,000 population (2022 est.) Country comparison to the world: 17th
41.1 births/1,000 population (2018 est.) Country comparison to the world: 6th

Death rate
6.12 deaths/1,000 population (2022 est.) Country comparison to the world: 152nd
12 deaths/1,000 population (2018 est.)

Total fertility rate
4.56 children born/woman (2022 est.) Country comparison to the world: 18th
5.58 children born/woman (2018 est.) Country comparison to the world: 8th

Population growth rate
2.9% (2022 est.) Country comparison to the world: 12th
2.91% (2018 est.) Country comparison to the world: 10th

Median age
total: 16.9 years. Country comparison to the world: 220th
male: 16.7 years
female: 17 years (2020 est.)

total: 16.8 years. Country comparison to the world: 222nd
male: 16.7 years 
female: 16.9 years (2018 est.)

total: 17.2 years
male: 17.1 years
female: 17.3 years (2010 est.)

total: 16.5 years
male: 16.4 years
female: 16.6 years (2002 est.)

Mother's mean age at first birth
19.2 years (2018 est.)
note: median age at first birth among women 20-49

Net migration rate
0.24 migrant(s)/1,000 population (2022 est.) Country comparison to the world: 77th

Contraceptive prevalence rate
49.6% (2018)
49% (2013/14)

Dependency ratios
total dependency ratio: 91.9 (2015 est.)
youth dependency ratio: 87.1 (2015 est.)
elderly dependency ratio: 4.8 (2015 est.)
potential support ratio: 20.8 (2015 est.)

Population distribution
one of the highest levels of urbanization in Africa; high density in the central area, particularly around the cities of Lusaka, Ndola, Kitwe, and Mufulira

Urbanization
urban population: 45.8% of total population (2022)
rate of urbanization: 4.15% annual rate of change (2020-25 est.)

urban population: 43.5% of total population (2018)
rate of urbanization: 4.23% annual rate of change (2015-20 est.)

Major infectious diseases
degree of risk: very high (2020)
food or waterborne diseases: bacterial and protozoal diarrhea, hepatitis A, and typhoid fever
vectorborne diseases: malaria and dengue fever
water contact diseases: schistosomiasis
animal contact diseases: rabies

Sex ratio
at birth: 1.03 male(s)/female
under 15 years: 1.01 male(s)/female
15-64 years: 1.01 male(s)/female
65 years and over: 0.68 male(s)/female
total population: 1 male(s)/female (2010 est.)

Life expectancy at birth
total population: 66.26 years. Country comparison to the world: 197th
male: 64.52 years
female: 68.06 years (2022 est.)

total population: 53 years 
male: 51.4 years 
female: 54.7 years (2018 est.)

total population: 52.7 years
male: 51.1 years
female: 54.4 years (2017 est.)

total population:37.24 years
male:37.08 years
female:37.41 years (2000 est.)

Education expenditures
4.5% of GDP (2019) Country comparison to the world: 85th

Nationality
noun:Zambian(s)
adjective:Zambian

Demographic profile
Zambia's  youthful population consists primarily of Bantu-speaking people representing nearly 70 different ethnicities. Zambia's high fertility rate continues to drive rapid population growth, averaging almost 3 percent annually between 2000 and 2010. The country's total fertility rate has fallen by less than 1.5 children per woman during the last 30 years and still averages among the world's highest, almost 6 children per woman, largely because of the country's lack of access to family planning services, education for girls, and employment for women. Zambia also exhibits wide fertility disparities based on rural or urban location, education, and income. Poor, uneducated women from rural areas are more likely to marry young, to give birth early, and to have more children, viewing children as a sign of prestige and recognizing that not all of their children will live to adulthood.

Languages

Bemba 33.4%, Nyanja 14.7%, Tonga 11.4%, Lozi 5.5%, Chewa 4.5%, Nsenga 2.9%, Tumbuka 2.5%, Lunda (North Western) 1.9%, Kaonde 1.8%, Lala 1.8%, Lamba 1.8%, English (official) 1.7%, Luvale 1.5%, Mambwe 1.3%, Namwanga 1.2%, Lenje 1.1%, Bisa 1%, other 9.7%, unspecified 0.2% (2010 est.)
note: Zambia is said to have over 70 languages, although many of these may be considered dialects; all of Zambia's major languages are members of the Bantu family

Literacy
definition: age 15 and over can read and write
total population: 86.7%
male: 90.6%
female: 83.1% (2018)

total population: 63.4%
male: 70.9%
female: 56% (2015 est.)

Unemployment, youth ages 15-24
total: 30.1%
male: 32.1%
female: 27.6% (2019 est.)

total: 15.2% 
male: 14.6% 
female: 15.8% (2012 est.)

See also
 Cultures of Zambia
 Angolans in Zambia
 Chinese people in Zambia
 Indians in Zambia
 Zimbabweans in Zambia

References